"Our Delight" is a 1946 jazz standard, composed by Tadd Dameron. It is considered one of his best compositions along with "Good Bait", "Hot House", "If You Could See Me Now", and "Lady Bird". It has an AABA construction. A moderately fast bebop song, it featured the trumpeter Fats Navarro, who is said to "exhibit mastery of the difficult chord progression". One author said, "'Our Delight' is a genuine song, a bubbly, jaggedly ascending theme that sticks in one's mind, enriched by harmonic interplay between a flaming trumpet section led by Dizzy, creamy moaning reeds and crooning trombones. The written accompaniments to the solos-in particular the leader's two statements-are full of inventiveness, creating call-and-response patterns and counter-melodies. What is boppish here is the off-center, syncopated melody, as well as the shifting, internal voicings of the chords, especially at the very end. These voicings, along with a love of tuneful melodies that one walks out of a jazz club humming, were Tadd's main legacy to such composers and arrangers as Benny Golson, Gigi Gryce, and Jimmy Heath." Rolling Stone describes it as a "bop gem". The first publication is by Dizzy Gillespie in August 1946. In total there are more than 120 covers of Our Delight. Bill Evans recorded his version of it for his debut album New Jazz Conceptions in 1956.

References

1940s jazz standards
1946 songs
Songs with music by Tadd Dameron